Couch is a surname.  It has two different origins.  It is a Cornish name thought to have derived from Cornish "cough" (red) and to have been a nickname for a redheaded man (the usual Cornish pronunciation is "cooch"). The Cornish surname appears in 1160 as "Coh" and over the centuries as "Coch," "Cogh," "Cooch," "Cough," "Cuche," "Cowche," "Cowtch," "Coutch," etc., until the spelling became standardized in recent centuries, generally as "Couch." There is also an English name Couch which probably originated as a name for a maker of beds or bedding. The English surname has variant forms Coucha, Couche, Coucher, Couchman and Cowcha. 

Notable people with the surname include:

Alan Couch (born 1953), Welsh footballer
Arthur Quiller-Couch (1863–1944), British writer and professor of literature, grandson of Jonathan Couch
Charles Couch (1833-1911), American politician
Darius Nash Couch (1822–1897), American soldier, businessman, and naturalist
Ethan Couch (born 1997), North Texas teenager convicted of killing four pedestrians 
Harvey C. Couch, Arkansas energy entrepreneur and businessman
Jane Couch, British woman boxer
John Couch, American football coach
John H. Couch (1811–1870), American sea captain and pioneer in the Oregon Country in the 19th century
Jonathan Couch (1789–1870), British naturalist
Mal Couch (1938–2013), American Christian writer
Marcos José Couch (born 1960), Argentine mountain climber 
Richard Quiller Couch, British naturalist, son of Jonathan Couch
Rebecca Couch (1788–1863), American painter
Tim Couch, former NFL quarterback
Tonia Couch, British Olympic diver
Warrick Couch, Australian astronomer
William Lewis Couch, leader of the Oklahoma Boomer movement
William Terry Couch (1901–1989), American intellectual and academic editor

See also
Couch's Mill, a hamlet in Cornwall
The John H. Couch, a side-wheel driven steamboat built in 1863

References

Cornish-language surnames
Surnames of British Isles origin